The eastern tree hyrax (Dendrohyrax validus) is a species of mammal within the family Procaviidae. The eastern tree hyrax is the most localized of the tree hyrax species, distributed patchily in a narrow band of lowland and montane forests in Kenya and Tanzania and adjacent islands.

Description
The eastern tree hyrax is a small, rotund guinea pig-like mammal with dense, soft fur and blunt, nailed toes. They weigh on average 2.75 kg and have a head-body length of 470–558 mm. No tail is discernible. Pelage is variable, with dorsal coloration ranging from cinnamon brown to blackish, and a paler underside. Individuals also have a distinctive dorsal scent gland marked by a contrasting, light-colored patch of hairs. Considerable variation exists between subspecies as currently described. The rostrum is relatively long, but well-haired, unlike the related western tree hyrax. Individuals of this species are difficult to distinguish from the related southern tree hyrax, which was previously considered conspecific; however, the fur of southern tree hyrax is usually more grizzled.

Behavior
The eastern tree hyrax is solitary, living in tree holes, and communicates with other individuals via repetitive vocal calls and scent marking. Most roosts are occupied by only one animal, with the exception of females with one young. They are skilled climbers which feed predominantly in the canopy on tree leaves, and form large middens adjacent to roost trees.

Ecology
Eastern tree hyraxes are largely restricted to montane forests, but also occur in adjacent lowland forests and even tropical dry forests on coral in Zanzibar and Pemba. They are most abundant at lower elevations, but occur as high as 3,070 meters on Mt. Kilimanjaro, albeit in reduced densities due to the scarcity of large trees.

In 2015, the IUCN designated the eastern tree hyrax as Near Threatened (NT). Its main threats include deforestation and hunting, and individuals often fall prey to dogs. Known natural predators include leopard, crowned eagle, and African python.

Distribution
The Eastern tree hyrax is endemic to the East African countries of Tanzania and Kenya; they predominantly inhabit the foothills and montane forests of Mount Kilimanjaro, Mount Meru and the Eastern Arc Mountains. The Eastern Arcs feature an ancient chain of isolated, relict forests, stretching from the Taita Hills of Southern Kenya to the Udzungwa Mountains of Tanzania. Hyraxes are also present on the coast between Tanga Region, Tanzania, and Mombasa, Kenya, as well as on the islands of Zanzibar and Pemba.

Taxonomy
The eastern tree hyrax is currently considered to have four subspecies:
D. v. validus, found on Mt. Kilimanjaro and Mt. Meru,
D. v. terricola, found in the Usambara and Pare Mountains,
Eastern tree hyraxes in Taita Hills were recently recorded and, based on call structure, likely represent individuals of this subspecies.

D. v. neumannii, found on the islands of Zanzibar and Pemba, and
D. v. schusteri, found in the Uluguru and likely the Udzungwa and Rubeho mountains.

The subspecific status of relict populations of Eastern Tree Hyrax described from coastal Southern Kenya is currently unclear. These populations have been described as using rock crevices as habitat, contrasting with Dendrohyrax’s usually-arboreal behavior.

These subspecies display considerable vocal and morphological variation, thus, some researchers consider Eastern Tree Hyrax to represent a complex of 3-4 distinct species, with further revision required.

Further reading
Rosti, Hanna. "Animals of Taita, Kenya." Animals of Taita, Kenya

References

Animals described in 1890
Hyraxes